Hajji Maqsud (also Romanized as Ḩājjī Maqşūd and Ḩājī Maqşūd) is a village in Chah Dasht Rural District, Shara District, Hamadan County, Hamadan Province, Iran. At the 2006 census, its population was 73, in 21 families.

References 

Populated places in Hamadan County